The Tour Oxygène (Oxygen Tower in English) is a skyscraper which  rises 28 levels in the district of La Part-Dieu in the 3rd arrondissement of Lyon, France. It forms part of the Oxygen Project, which includes the office tower and a shopping center, the Cours Oxygène. The tower rises 115 meters high.

This zone is served by the metro line

Project
Rising to 115 m high and with 80% glass area, the tower is smaller than its close neighbor, the Part-Dieu tower (165 meters at the top of the pyramid), but dominates the Swiss Tower (82 meters) which it directly faces. It has 28,794 m2 of offices where two-thirds, 16,000 m2 from the first to the 17th floor, are already reserved by the SNCF, which wants to install the seat of its national leadership computing.

The extension of the shopping center La Part Dieu (the "Oxygen Course") adds a sales area of 11,040 m2 to the current center (including 2,000 m2 reserved by Monoprix).

The promoter is the group Sogelym Steiner and businesses are GFC Construction and Bouygues Construction Privée. Anticipating the construction of one floor every four days, the group used two types of cranes: two Potain tower cranes (MD 365 B L16 of 16 tons and MDT 222 J12 of 12 tons), and the proximity of the shopping center site with the tower required the use of two other cranes (MR 225A of 14 tons).

The tower contains eighty workstations per tray of 1,000 m2 each located on twenty-eight floors served by seven lifts. On May 4, 2010, the new mall reached 15 000m ² with 25 new shops.

History
 In June 2006, the Departmental Committee of Commercial Equipment agreed the proposed shopping mall at the bottom of the tower Oxygen.
 On 29 March 2007, the first building was laid in the presence of Gérard Collomb, then mayor of Lyon.
 On 11 July 2008, the clearance work was completed and foundation work began.
 In January 2009, the tower rose 40 meters high.
 On 29 March 2009, the tower rose 85 meters high and became the second tallest building in the neighborhood beating the Tour Swiss Life.
 In late April the tower was over 100 meters high.
 The Oxygen tower finally reached its maximum height of 115 meters in May 2009.

See also
 Tour Incity
 Tour du Crédit Lyonnais
 Sustainable architecture

References

External links 
Official Website

3rd arrondissement of Lyon
Office buildings completed in 2010
Skyscrapers in Lyon
Skyscraper office buildings in France
21st-century architecture in France